was an early Heian period poet, included in the Rokkasen and in the Thirty-six Poetry Immortals. He attained upper sixth rank.

In the Kokinshū'''s Kanajo (Japanese preface), Yasuhide is described as "Yasuhide used words skillfully, but his words do not match the content. His poetry is like a merchant dressed up in elegant clothes." Five of his poems are included in the Kokinshū and one of his poems is included in the Goshūi wakashū''. He was involved in a relationship with Ono no Komachi and it is even said that when he received his appointment to Mikawa, he invited her to go with him.

His son was the poet Fun'ya no Asayasu.

References 

People of Heian-period Japan
Japanese male poets
880s deaths
Year of birth unknown
Year of death unknown
9th-century Japanese poets
Hyakunin Isshu poets